The National Historic Landmarks in Florida are representations of a broad sweep of history from Pre-Columbian times, through the Second Seminole War and Civil War, and the Space Age. There are 47 National Historic Landmarks (NHLs) in Florida, which are located in twenty-two of the state's sixty-seven counties. Sixteen of the NHLs in the state are significant examples of a particular architectural style, eleven have military significance, ten are archaeological sites, three were the homes of well-known American authors, and one is associated with the development of the U.S. Space Program.

Six sites are in state parks and managed by the Florida Department of Environmental Protection.

Also included is a site determined eligible for National Historic Landmark status, and a list of historical sites in Florida managed by the U.S. National Park Service which also have national significance.

The National Historic Landmark program is administered by the National Park Service, a branch of the Department of the Interior. The National Park Service determines which properties meet NHL criteria and makes nomination recommendations after an owner notification process. The Secretary of the Interior reviews nominations and, based on a set of predetermined criteria, makes a decision on NHL designation or a determination of eligibility for designation. Both public and privately owned properties are designated as NHLs. This designation provides indirect, partial protection of the historic integrity of the properties, via tax incentives, grants, monitoring of threats, and other means. Owners may object to the nomination of the property as a NHL. When this is the case the Secretary of the Interior can only designate a site as eligible for designation.

NHLs are also included on the National Register of Historic Places (NRHP), which are historic properties that the National Park Service deems to be worthy of preservation. The primary difference between a NHL and a NRHP listing is that the NHLs are determined to have national significance, while other NRHP properties are deemed significant at the local or state level. The NHLs in Florida comprise 2.6% of the approximately 1,600 properties and districts listed on the National Register of Historic Places in Florida.

Current NHLs

|}

Eligible National Historic Landmark
The following property was determined eligible for National Historic Landmark status, but did not become one. It is listed on the National Register of Historic Places.

Historic areas of the NPS in Florida
National Historic Sites, National Historical Parks, some National Monuments, and certain other areas listed in the National Park system are historic landmarks of national importance that are highly protected already, often before the inauguration of the NHL program in 1960, and are then often not also named NHLs per se. There are six of these in Florida. The National Park Service lists these six together with the NHLs in the state.

See also
History of Florida
List of U.S. National Historic Landmarks by state
National Register of Historic Places listings in Florida

References

External links
 National Historic Landmarks Program, at National Park Service
 National Park Service listings of National Historic Landmarks
 

Florida
 
National Historic Landmarks
National Historic Landmarks